Shengwei Mei is a professor of electrical engineering at the Department of Electrical Engineering at Tsinghua University in Beijing, China. He was named a Fellow of the Institute of Electrical and Electronics Engineers (IEEE) in 2015 for his work on the robust control and complexity analysis of power systems.

References

External links

20th-century births
Living people
Chinese electrical engineers
Academic staff of Tsinghua University
Fellow Members of the IEEE
Year of birth missing (living people)
Place of birth missing (living people)